Goose Creek is a  long 3rd order tributary to the Rocky River in Union County, North Carolina.

Course
Goose Creek rises in Mint Hill, North Carolina in Mecklenburg County.  Goose Creek then flows south into Union County and turns northeast to join the Rocky River about 4 miles northeast of Fairview.

Watershed
Goose Creek drains  of area, receives about 47.6 in/year of precipitation, has a wetness index of 441.26, and is about 46% forested.

References

Rivers of North Carolina
Rivers of Mecklenburg County, North Carolina
Rivers of Union County, North Carolina